Carpenter, New Mexico may refer to:

 Carpenter, Bernalillo County, New Mexico
 Carpenter, Grant County, New Mexico